MPNS may refer to:
MPNS (gene)
Microsoft Push Notification Service